55 Cancri f (abbreviated 55 Cnc f), also designated Rho1 Cancri f and formally named Harriot , is an exoplanet approximately 41 light-years away from Earth in the constellation of Cancer (the Crab).  55 Cancri f is the fourth known planet (in order of distance) from the star 55 Cancri and the first planet to have been given the designation of "f".

Name
In July 2014 the International Astronomical Union launched NameExoWorlds, a process for giving proper names to certain exoplanets and their host stars. The process involved public nomination and voting for the new names. In December 2015, the IAU announced the winning name was Harriot for this planet. The winning name was submitted by the Royal Netherlands Association for Meteorology and Astronomy of the Netherlands. It honors the astronomer Thomas Harriot.

Discovery 

The initial presentation of this planet occurred at a meeting of the American Astronomical Society in April 2005, however it was another two and a half years before the planet was to be published in a peer-reviewed journal.  It is the first known planet outside the Solar System to spend its entire orbit within what astronomers call the "habitable zone".  Furthermore, its discovery made 55 Cancri the first star other than the Sun known to have at least five planets.

Orbit and mass

55 Cancri f is located about 0.781 AU away from the star and takes 262 days to complete a full orbit. A limitation of the radial velocity method used to detect 55 Cancri f is that only a minimum mass can be obtained, in this case around 0.144 times that of Jupiter, or half the mass of Saturn. A Keplerian fit to the radial velocity data of 55 Cancri A indicates that the orbit is consistent with being circular, however changing the value in a range between 0 and 0.4 does not significantly alter the chi-squared statistic of the fit, thus a representative eccentricity of 0.2±0.2 was assumed. In a Newtonian model which takes interactions between the planets into account, the eccentricity comes out as 0.0002, almost perfectly circular.

Astrometric observations made with the Hubble Space Telescope suggest that the outer planet 55 Cancri d is inclined at 53° with respect to the plane of the sky. The inner planets b and e are inclined at 85°. The inclination of f is unknown.

Characteristics 
Since the planet was detected indirectly through observations of its star, properties such as its radius, composition and temperature are unknown. With a mass half that of Saturn, 55 Cancri f is likely to be a gas giant with no solid surface. It orbits in the so-called "habitable zone," which means that liquid water  and life could exist on the surface of a possible moons.

It is not known if the composition and appearance is more like that of Saturn or Neptune.

See also
 Appearance of extrasolar planets
 Cancer (Chinese astronomy)
 Lists of exoplanets
 Planetary system

References

External links

 

55 Cancri
Cancer (constellation)
Exoplanets discovered in 2005
Exoplanets detected by radial velocity
Giant planets in the habitable zone
Exoplanets with proper names